Estefanía Romina Banini Ruiz (born 21 June 1990) is an Argentine professional footballer who plays as a forward for Spanish Primera División club Atlético Madrid and the Argentina women's national team.

Banini has previously spent four seasons with Colo-Colo of the Chilean women's football championship, two seasons with the Spirit, and a season with Valencia. Banini was previously a member of the Argentine women's national team, captaining the team in their second ever World Cup campaign in 2019. She is often referred to as the female equivalent of male football star Lionel Messi and the Marta of Argentina.

Club career

Colo-Colo
Banini played for Colo-Colo in Chile from 2011 to 2014. In December 2014, she captained the team to win its ninth consecutive national title after scoring twice and defeating Santiago Morning 3–1.

Washington Spirit (2015–2016)
In January 2015, it was announced that Banini had signed with the Washington Spirit for the third season of the National Women's Soccer League (NWSL). Of her signing, Spirit head coach Mark Parsons said, "Estefania is an exceptional talent and I do not think there is a player like her in the league. She is going to give the team a very different dynamic and provide us with real quality in the final third." She played and started in the first four games of the 2015 season before sustaining an injury which sidelined her for the rest of the year. Banini came back strong midway through the 2016 season, scoring five goals in a seven-game period before sustaining another injury. The Argentine was awarded the Spirit 2016 Golden Boot award, NWSL Goal of the Week for Week 13, NWSL Player of the Week for Week 13, and NWSL Player of the Month for July.

Valencia (2016–2017)
In October 2016 Banini transferred to Spain's Primera División club Valencia CF Femenino.

Washington Spirit (2017–present)
Banini re-signed with the Washington Spirit on 19 June 2017. she appeared in 9 games in 2017, and scored 1 goal. In 2018 Banini only appeared in 12 games for the Spirit as she missed time due to the 2018 Copa América and missed the last seven games of the season due to a knee injury.

On 4 December 2018 Banini re-signed with the Spirit for the 2019 NWSL season.

Loan to Levante
On 17 October 2018 Banini joined Levante in the Spanish Primera División.

Levante (2019-2021)
Although intended to play through the 2019 NWSL season, Banini signed a full contract with Levante in June 2019 that would last for two years. In her time at the club, she helped the team qualify for their first ever UEFA Women's Champions League tournament. In the 2021 Copa de la Reina final, she scored Levante's second goal against FC Barcelona Femení, but the match ended 4-2 in favor of Barcelona.

Atlético Madrid (2021–present)
On 3 July 2021, Banini's transfer from Levante to Atlético Madrid was made official.

International career
Banini has played for the Argentina women's national football team since 2010. In September 2014, she scored a penalty kick in a match against Brazil helping Argentina win 2–0 during the Copa América Femenina tournament. Banini scored three goals at the 2018 Copa América Femenina.

Banini was called up to participate in the 2019 FIFA Women's World Cup with Argentina. In the tournament, she helped Argentina win their first ever World Cup point, earning a 0-0 draw against Japan. Following Argentina's exit in the group stage, Banini spoke out against national team coach Carlos Borrello for his outdated coaching methods and the Argentine Football Association (AFA) for poor working conditions. Banini was not called up to the national team for nearly three years following her statements.

At the end of 2020, Banini was named to the IFFHS' CONMEBOL Women's Team of the 2011-2020 Decade, the only Argentine on the list.

Banini made her international return for Argentina on 8 April 2022, starting in a 0–1 friendly home loss to Chile and playing the entire match.

International goals
Scores and results list Argentina's goal tally first

Honors and awards
Club
Colo-Colo
 Torneo de Clausura Femenino champion: 2011, 2012, 2013, 2014 
 Copa Libertadores: 2012

Individual
 Player of the Year in Chile: 2013
 IFFHS CONMEBOL Woman Team of the Decade 2011–2020
 FIFA FIFPro Women's World11: 2021

References

External links

 Washington Spirit player profile
 Colo Colo player profile
 
 Profile at La Liga 
 Estefanía Banini at FutbolEsta.com 

1990 births
Living people
Sportspeople from Mendoza, Argentina
Argentine sportspeople of Italian descent
Argentine women's footballers
Women's association football forwards
National Women's Soccer League players
Primera División (women) players
Colo-Colo (women) footballers
Washington Spirit players
Valencia CF Femenino players
Levante UD Femenino players
Argentina women's international footballers
Competitors at the 2014 South American Games
South American Games gold medalists for Argentina
South American Games medalists in football
Argentine expatriate women's footballers
Argentine expatriate sportspeople in Chile
Expatriate women's footballers in Chile
Argentine expatriate sportspeople in the United States
Expatriate women's soccer players in the United States
Argentine expatriate sportspeople in Spain
Expatriate women's footballers in Spain
2019 FIFA Women's World Cup players
Atlético Madrid Femenino players